Canarium wilsonorum is a species of sea snail, a marine gastropod mollusk in the family Strombidae, the true conchs.

Description

Distribution
This species occurs in the Indian Ocean off Mozambique, Tanzania and the Mascarene Basin.

References

 Kilburn, R.N. (1977) Taxonomic studies on the marine Mollusca of southern Africa and Mozambique. Part 1. Annals of the Natal Museum, 23, 173–214.
 Walls, J.G. (1980). Conchs, tibias and harps. A survey of the molluscan families Strombidae and Harpidae. T.F.H. Publications Ltd, Hong Kong. 
 Steyn, D.G. & Lussi, M. (1998) Marine Shells of South Africa. An Illustrated Collector’s Guide to Beached Shells. Ekogilde Publishers, Hartebeespoort, South Africa, ii + 264 pp. page(s): 44 
 Liverani V. (2014) The superfamily Stromboidea. Addenda and corrigenda. In: G.T. Poppe, K. Groh & C. Renker (eds), A conchological iconography. pp. 1-54, pls 131-164. Harxheim: Conchbooks.

External links
 Abbott, R.T. (1967). Strombus (Canarium) wilsoni new species from the Indo-Pacific. Indo-Pacific Mollusca. 1(7): 455-456.

Strombidae
Gastropods described in 1967